Florentin-Étienne Jaussen, SS.CC., (2 April 1815 – 9 September 1891) was the first bishop of Tahiti and the man who brought the rongorongo script of Easter Island to the world's attention. In the 1860s Bishop Jaussen was responsible for ending the slave raids on Easter Island.

Jaussen was born in Rocles, France. He was Vicar Apostolic of Tahiti and titular bishop of Axieri from 9 May 1848 until 12 February 1884, when he resigned. During this time he went by the name Tepano, the Tahitian pronunciation of Etienne in its original Greek form Stephanos.

He ordained the first native priest of Eastern Polynesia Tiripone Mama Taira Putairi, on 24 December 1874.

He died on 9 September 1891 at the episcopal palace in Tahiti.

See also

Decipherment of rongorongo#Jaussen

References

CHAUVET, Stéphen-Charles. 1935. L'île de Pâques et ses mystères ("Easter Island and its Mysteries"). Paris: Éditions Tel. (An online English version translated by Ann Altman and edited by Shawn McLaughlin is available www.chauvet-translation.com here.)

People from Ardèche
French Roman Catholic missionaries
French Polynesian Roman Catholic bishops
Roman Catholic missionaries in French Polynesia
Picpus Fathers
Rongorongo
1815 births
1891 deaths
Roman Catholic bishops of Papeete